was a village located in Ama District, Aichi Prefecture, Japan.

As of 2003, the village had an estimated population of 8,295 and a population density of 336.24 persons per km². The total land area was 24.67 km².

On April 1, 2005, Tatsuta, along with the towns of Saya and Saori, and the village of Hachikai (all from Ama District), was merged to create the city Aisai.

Dissolved municipalities of Aichi Prefecture
Aisai, Aichi